Eveline Kotai (born 1950) is an Australian artist. Kotai is known for her idiosyncratic stitched collages, which involves the artist cutting up her paintings into thin strips and reconfiguring them across a surface with the use of a sewing machine and invisible thread.

Biography
Born in 1950 in Perth Western Australia, she began her tertiary art studies in 1975-79 studying drawing and sculpture at Curtin University & TAFE. She currently resides in Fremantle, Western Australia.

In 2016, with collaborators Margaret Dillon and Penny Bovell, she created a public artwork for the Western Australia Museum Research Centre.

Collections
 Art Gallery of Western Australia
 City of Fremantle Art Collection
 Cruthers Collection of Women's Art, the University of Western Australia.
 City of Wanneroo, Australia

Awards

 The 2018 Cossack Art Award “Horizontal Shift”
 The 2012 Blake Prize (co-winner) “Writing on Air – Mantra”

References

External links
Official site

Living people
1950 births
20th-century Australian women artists
20th-century Australian artists
21st-century Australian women artists
21st-century Australian artists